Latvia participated in the XII Summer Paralympic Games in Athens, Greece.

Medalists

Results by event

Athletics

Men's

Women's

See also
2004 Summer Paralympics
Latvia at the 2004 Summer Olympics

External links
International Paralympic Committee
Latvian Paralympic Committee

Nations at the 2004 Summer Paralympics
2004
Paralympics